The genetic history of North Africa has been heavily influenced by geography. The Sahara desert to the south and the Mediterranean Sea to the North were important barriers to gene flow from sub-Saharan Africa and Europe in prehistoric times. However, North Africa is connected to Western Asia via the Isthmus of Suez and the Sinai peninsula, while at the Straits of Gibraltar North Africa and Europe are separated by only , similarly Malta, Sicily and Crete are close to the coasts of North Africa.

Although North Africa has experienced gene flows from the surrounding regions, it has also experienced long periods of genetic isolation, allowing a distinctive genetic "Berber marker" to evolve in the native Berber people, as well as the "Coptic marker" among Egyptian Copts. Today, this genetic "Berber marker" is consistently found in the regions and populations that still predominantly speak the Berber languages, as well as in the Atlantic Canary Islands. Similarly, the "Coptic marker" is found among Egyptians, particularly Coptic Christians in Egypt. A recent genetic study showed that modern North Africans retain a significant genetic component from Paleolithic North Africans of the Iberomaurusian period.

Current scientific debate is concerned with determining the relative contributions of different periods of gene flow to the current gene pool of North Africans. Anatomically modern humans are known to have been present in North Africa during the Middle Paleolithic (300,000 years ago), as attested by the by Jebel Irhoud 1. Without morphological discontinuity, the Aterian was succeeded by the Iberomaurusian industry, whose lithic assemblages bore close relations with the Cro-Magnon cultures of Europe and Western Asia, rather than to the cultures of sub-Saharan Africa or the Horn of Africa. The Iberomaurusian industry was succeeded by the heavily West Asian influenced Capsian industry (8000 BCE to 2700 BCE) in the eastern part of North Africa (Egypt, Libya, Tunisia, eastern Algeria, Malta).

In the 7th century A.D., parts of the Berber inhabited region was conquered by Muslim Umayyad Arabs from the Arabian Peninsula. Under the relatively brief Arab-Umayyad conquest and the later arrival of some Bedouin Arabs and Levantine people from the Near East in Western Asia and the arrival of some Sephardi Jews and Iberian Muslims fleeing the Spanish Catholic Reconquista of Iberia, a partial population mix or fusion have taken place and have resulted in some genetic diversity among some North Africans.

Y-chromosome

Haplogroup E is the most common paternal haplogroup among Berbers. It represents up to 100 percent of Y-chromosomes among some Berber populations. Haplogroup E is thought to have emerged in prehistoric North Africa or East Africa, and would have later dispersed into West Asia. The major subclades of haplogroup E found amongst Berbers belong to E-Z827, which is believed to have emerged in North Africa. Common subclades include E1b1b1a, E1b1b1b and E1b1b1*. E1b1b1b is distributed along a west-to-east cline with frequencies that can reach as high as 100 percent in Northwest Africa. E1b1b1a has been observed at low to moderate frequencies among Berber populations with significantly higher frequencies observed in Northeast Africa relative to Northwest Africa.

West Eurasian haplogroups, such as Haplogroup J and Haplogroup R1, have also been observed at moderate frequencies. A thorough study by Arredi et al. (2004), which analyzed populations from Algeria, concludes that the North African pattern of Y-chromosomal variation (including both J1 and E1b1b main haplogroups) is largely of Neolithic origin, which suggests that the Neolithic transition in this part of the world was accompanied by demic diffusion of Berber–speaking pastoralists from the Middle East, although later papers have suggested that this date could have been as long as ten thousand years ago, with the transition from the Oranian to the Capsian culture in North Africa. However, Loosdrecht et al. 2018 demonstrated that E1b1b is most likely indigenous to North Africa and migrated from North Africa to the Near East during the Paleolithic.

Keita (2008) examined a published Y-chromosome dataset on Afro-Asiatic populations and found that a key lineage E-M35/E-M78, sub-clade of haplogroup E, was shared between the populations in the locale of original Egyptian speakers and modern Cushitic speakers from the Horn. These lineages are present in Egyptians, Berbers, Cushitic speakers from the Horn of Africa, and Semitic speakers in the Near-East. He noted that variants are also found in the Aegean and Balkans, but the origin of the M35 subclade was in East Africa, and its clades were dominant in a core portion of Afro-Asiatic speaking populations which included Cushitic, Egyptian and Berber groups, in contrast Semitic speakers showed a decline in frequency going west to east in the Levantine-Syria region. Keita identified high frequencies of M35 (>50%) among Omotic populations, but stated that this derived from a small, published sample of 12. Keita also wrote that the PN2 mutation was shared by M35 and M2 lineages and this defined clade originated from East Africa. He concluded that "the genetic data give population profiles that clearly indicate males of African origin, as opposed to being of Asian or European descent" but acknowledged that the biodiversity does not indicate any specific set of skin colors or facial features as populations were subject to microevolutionary pressures

E1b1b1b (E-M81); formerly E3b1b, E3b2

E1b1b1b (E-M81) is the most common Y chromosome haplogroup in North Africa, dominated by its sub-clade E-M183. It is thought to have originated in North Africa 5,600 years ago. The parent clade, E1b1b, is thought to have originated in East Africa in prehistoric times. Colloquially referred to as the Berber Marker for its prevalence among Mozabite, Middle Atlas, and other Berber-speaking groups, E-M81 is also quite common among North African groups. It reaches frequencies of up to 90 percent in some parts of the Maghreb. This includes the Saharawi for whose men  reports that approximately 76 percent are M81+.

This haplogroup is also found at hight levels in Canary islands, with lower but significant amounts also in Portugal, Southern Spain, Southern Italy and the Provence region of France. As a result of European colonization, E-M81 is found in parts of Latin America, among Hispanic in USA. This sub-clade of E1b1b1 has also been observed at 40 percent in the comarca Pasiegos from Cantabria.

In smaller numbers, E-M81 men can be found in Malta, Northern Sudan, Cyprus and among Sephardic Jews.

There are two recognized sub-clades, although one is much more common than the other.
Sub clades of E1b1b1b (E-M81):
E1b1b1b1 (E-M107).  found one example in Mali.
E1b1b1b2 (E-M183). Individuals with the defining marker for this clade, M81, also test positive, in tests so far, for M183. As of October 23, 2008, the SNP M165 is currently considered to define a subclade, "E1b1b1b2a".

The general parent Y-chromosome Haplogroup E1b1b (formerly known as E3b), which might have originated in North Africa, the Horn of Africa or Western Asia is by far the most common clade in North and Northeast Africa and found in select populations in Europe, particularly in the Mediterranean and South Eastern Europe. E1b1b reaches Greece, Malta and the Balkan region in Europe but is not as high there as it is among North African populations.
Outside of North and Northeast Africa, E1b1b's two most prevalent clades are E1b1b1a (E-M78, formerly E3b1a) and E1b1b1b (E-M81, formerly E3b1b).

A study from Semino (published 2004) showed that Y-chromosome haplotype E1b1b1b (E-M81), is specific to North African populations and almost absent in Europe, Western Asia and sub-Saharan Africa, except Iberia (Spain, Portugal, Gibraltar and Andorra) and Sicily. Another 2004 study showed that E1b1b1b is found present, albeit at low levels throughout Southern Europe (ranging from 1.5 percent in Northern Italians, 2.2 percent in Central Italians, 1.6 percent in Southern Spaniards, 3.5 percent in the French, 4 percent in the Northern Portuguese, 12.2 percent in the Southern Portuguese and 41.2 percent in the genetic isolate of the Pasiegos from Cantabria in Italy).

The findings of this latter study contradict a more thorough analysis Y-chromosome analysis of the Iberian peninsula according to which haplogroup E1b1b1b surpasses frequencies of 10 percent in Southern Spain and southern Portugal. The study points only to a very limited influence from Northern Africa and West Asia in Iberia, both in historic and prehistoric times. The absence of microsatellite variation suggests a very recent arrival from North Africa consistent with historical exchanges across the Mediterranean during the period of Islamic expansion, namely of Berber populations. However, a study restricted to Portugal, concerning Y-chromosome lineages, revealed that "The mtDNA and Y-DNA data indicate that the presence of Berber related peoples in that region dates very clearly prior to the Moorish expansion in 711 AD, so it's potentially not recent there. The data indicated that male Berbers, unlike recent sub-Saharan immigrants, constituted long-lasting and continuous communities in the country.

A wide-ranging study (published 2007) using 6,501 unrelated Y-chromosome samples from 81 populations found that: "Considering both these E-M78 sub-haplogroups (E-V12, E-V22, E-V65) and the E-M81 haplogroup, the contribution of Northern African lineages to the entire male gene pool of Iberia (barring Pasiegos), continental Italy and Sicily can be estimated as 5.6 percent, 3.6 percent and 6.6 percent, respectively." It has also been argued that the European distribution of E-M78 and its sub-clades is compatible with the Neolithic demic diffusion of agriculture, but also possibly partly from at least, the Mesolithic. For example,  estimated that E-M78 (called E1b1b1a1 in that paper) has been in Europe longer than 10,000 years. In support of this theory, human remains excavated in a Spanish funeral cave dating from approximately 7,000 years ago were shown to be in this haplogroup. More recently, two E-M78 have been found in the Neolithic Sopot and Lengyel cultures from the same period, which seems supported by the most recent studies (including autosomal research).

A very recent study about Sicily by Gaetano et al. 2008 found that "The Hg E3b1b-M81, widely diffused in northwestern African populations, is estimated to contribute to the Sicilian gene pool at a rate of 6 percent."

According to the most recent and thorough study about Iberia by Adams et al. 2008 that analysed 1,140 unrelated Y-chromosome samples in Iberia, a limited contribution of northern African lineages to the entire male gene pool of Iberia was found : "mean North African admixture is just 10.6 percent, with wide geographical variation, ranging from zero in Gascony to 21.7 percent in Northwest Castile".

Mitochondrial DNA 

Individuals receive mtDNA only from their mothers. According to Macaulay et al. 1999, "one-third (33%) of Mozabite Berber mtDNAs have a Near Eastern ancestry, probably having arrived in North Africa less than 50,000 years ago, and one-eighth (12.5%) have an origin in sub-Saharan Africa. Europe appears to be the source of many of the remaining sequences, with the rest having arisen either in Europe or in the Near East". Maca-Meyer et al. 2003 analyze the "autochthonous North African lineage U6" in mtDNA, and conclude that:

The most probable origin of the proto-U6 lineage was the Near East. Around 30,000 years ago it spread to North Africa where it represents a signature of regional continuity. Subgroup U6a reflects the first North African expansion from the Maghreb returning to the east in Paleolithic times. Derivative clade U6a1 signals a posterior movement from Western Asia back to the Maghreb and North Africa. This migration coincides with a possible Afroasiatic linguistic expansion.

A genetic study by Fadhlaoui-Zid et al. 2004 argues concerning certain exclusively North African haplotypes that "expansion of this group of lineages took place around 10,500 years ago in North Africa, and spread to neighbouring population", and apparently that a specific Northwestern African haplotype, U6, probably originated in the Near East 30,000 years ago accounts for 28 percent in Mozabites, 18 percent in Kabyles, but only accounts for 6-8 percent in the southern Moroccan Berbers. Rando et al. 1998 "detected female-mediated gene flow from sub-Saharan Africa to NW Africa" amounting to as much as 21.5 percent of the mtDNA sequences in a sample of NW African populations; the amount varied from 82 percent in Tuaregs to less than 3 percent in Riffians in north of Morocco. This north-south gradient in the sub-Saharan contribution to the gene pool is supported by Esteban et al.

Nevertheless, individual Berber communities display a considerably high mtDNA heterogeneity among them. The Berbers of Jerba Island, located in South Eastern Tunisia, display an 87 percent West Eurasian contribution with no U6 haplotypes, while the Kesra of Tunisia, for example, display a much higher proportion of typical sub-Saharan mtDNA haplotypes (49 percent), as compared to the Zriba (8 percent). According to the article, "The North African patchy mtDNA landscape has no parallel in other regions of the world and increasing the number of sampled populations has not been accompanied by any substantial increase in our understanding of its phylogeography. Available data up to now rely on sampling small, scattered populations, although they are carefully characterized in terms of their ethnic, linguistic, and historical backgrounds. It is therefore doubtful that this picture truly represents the complex historical demography of the region rather than being just the result of the type of samplings performed so far."

A 2005 study discovered a close mitochondrial link between Berbers and the Uralic speaking Saami of northern Scandinavia and the sub-Arctic, and argues that Southwestern Europe and North Africa was the source of late-glacial expansions of hunter-gatherers that repopulated Northern Europe after a retreat south during the Last Glacial Maximum, and reveals a direct maternal link between those European hunter-gatherer populations and the Berbers. With regard to Mozabite Berbers, one-third (33%) of Mozabite Berber mtDNAs have a Near Eastern ancestry, probably having arrived in North Africa ~50,000 years ago, and one-eighth (12.5%) have an origin in sub-Saharan Africa. Europe appears to be the source of many of the remaining sequences, with the rest (54.5%) having arisen either in Europe or in the Near East."

According to the most recent and thorough study on Berber mtDNA from Coudray et al. 2008, which analysed 614 individuals from 10 different regions (Morocco (Asni, Bouhria, Figuig, Souss), Algeria (Mozabites), Tunisia (Chenini-Douiret, Sened, Matmata, Jerba) and Egypt (Siwa)), the results may be summarized as follows:

 Total West Eurasian lineages (H, HV, R0, J, M, T, U, K, N1, N2, X) : 80 percent
 Total African lineages (L0, L1, L2, L3, L4, L5) : 20 percent

The Berber mitochondrial pool is characterized by an overall high frequency of Western Eurasian haplogroups, a markedly lower frequency of sub-Saharan L lineages, and a significant (but differential) presence of North African haplogroups U6 and M1.

There is a degree of dispute about when and how the minority sub-Saharan L haplogroups entered the North African gene pool. Some papers suggest that the distribution of the main L haplogroups in North Africa was mainly due to the Islamic era trans-Saharan slave trade, as espoused by Harich et .al in a study conducted in 2010. However, also in September 2010, a study of Berber mtDNA by Frigi et al. concluded that some of the L haplogroups were much older and introduced by an ancient African gene flow around 20,000 years ago.

Genetic studies on Iberian populations also show that North African mitochondrial DNA sequences (haplogroup U6) and sub-Saharan sequences (Haplogroup L), although present at only low levels, are still at higher levels than those generally observed elsewhere in Europe, though very likely, most of the L mtDNA that has been found in minor amounts in Iberia, is actually pre-neolithic in origin, as it was demonstrated by María Cerezo et al., (Reconstructing ancient mitochondrial DNA links between Africa and Europe) and U6 too, which also have a very old presence in Iberia, since Iberia has a great diversity in lineages from this haplogroup, it was already found in some local hunter-gatherer remains and its local geographic distribution is not compatible, in many cases, with Moor occupation area. Haplogroup U6 have also been detected in Sicily and Southern Italy at much lower frequencies. It happens also to be a characteristic genetic marker of the Saami populations of Northern Scandinavia.

It is difficult to ascertain that U6's presence is the consequence of Islam's expansion into Europe during the Middle Ages, particularly because it is more frequent in the west of the Iberian Peninsula rather than in the east. In smaller numbers it is also attested in the British Isles, again in its northern and western borders. It may be a trace of a prehistoric Neolithic/Megalithic/Mesolithic or even Upper Paleolithic expansion along the Atlantic coasts from North Africa or Iberian Peninsula, perhaps in conjunction with seaborne trade, although an alternative, but less likely explanation, would attribute this distribution in Northern Britain to the Roman period. One subclade of U6 is particularly common among Canarian Spaniards as a result of native Guanche (proto-Berber) ancestry.

Autosomal DNA 
On 13 January 2012, an exhaustive genetic study of North Africa's human populations was published in PLoS Genetics and was undertaken jointly by researchers in the Evolutionary Biology Institute (CSIC-UPF) and Stanford University, among other institutions.

The study reveals that the genetic composition of North Africa's human populations is extremely complex, and the result of a local component dating back thirteen thousand years to approximately 11,000 BC and the varied genetic influence of neighbouring populations on North African groups during successive migrations. According to David Comas, coordinator of the study and researcher at the Institute for Evolutionary Biology (CSIC-UPF), "some of the questions we wanted to answer were whether today's inhabitants are direct descendants of the populations with the oldest archaeological remains in the region, dating back fifty thousand years, or whether they are descendants of the Neolithic populations in the Middle East, which introduced agriculture to the region around nine thousand years ago. We also wondered if there had been any genetic exchange between the North African populations and the neighbouring regions and if so, when these took place".

To answer these questions, the researchers analyzed around 800,000 genetic markers, distributed throughout the entire genome in 125 North African individuals belonging to seven representative populations in the whole region, and the information obtained was compared with the information from the neighbouring populations.

The results of this study show that there is a native genetic component that defines North Africans and is "distinct" from sub-Saharan Africans and closer to (West-) Eurasians, specifically Middle Easterners and Europeans. In-depth study of these markers shows that the people inhabiting North Africa today are not descendants of the earliest occupants of this region fifty thousand years ago,but shows that the ancestors of today's North Africans were a group of populations that settled in the region around 12,000 years ago (ya). Furthermore, this distinct local North African (Maghrebi) genetic component is different from the ancestries found in the populations of sub-Saharan Africa. Modern North African populations were observed to share genetic markers in varying degrees with all the neighbouring regions (Southern Europe, West Asia, sub-Saharan Africa), probably as a result of more recent migrations.

Hodgson et al. 2014 found a distinct non-African ancestry component among Northeastern Africans (dubbed "Ethio-Somali"), which split from other West-Eurasian ancestries, and is most closely related to the North African (Maghrebi), and Arabian ancestry components. Both would have entered Africa during a pre-agricultural period (between 12,000 to 23,000 years ago). This component is suggested to have been present in considerable amounts among the Proto-Afroasiatic-speaking peoples. The authors argue that the Ethio-Somali component and the Maghrebi component descended from a single ancestral lineage, which split from the Arabian lineage and migrated into Africa from the Middle East. That is, a common ancestral population migrated into Africa through Sinai and then split into two, with one branch continuing west across North Africa and the other heading south into the HOA.

A 2015 study by Dobon et al. identified another ancestral autosomal component of West Eurasian origin that is common to many modern Afro-Asiatic-speaking populations in Northeast Africa. Known as the Coptic component, it peaks among Egyptian Copts, including those who settled in Sudan over the past two centuries. The Coptic component evolved out of a main North African and Middle Eastern ancestral component that is shared by other Egyptians and also found at high frequencies among other populations in Northern Africa. The scientists suggest that this points to a common origin for the general population of Egypt. They also associate the Coptic component with Ancient Egyptian ancestry, without the later minority Medieval Era Arabian and sub-Saharan African influence that is present among other Egyptians.

According to a paper published in 2017, most of the genetic studies on North African populations agree with a limited correlation between genetics and geography, showing a high population heterogeneity in the region (without strong differences between Arabs and Berbers). Northern African populations have been described as a mosaic of North African (Taforalt), Middle Eastern, European (Early European Farmers) and sub-Saharan ancestries. 

Ancient North African samples such as the Paleolithic Taforalt, were found to be composed of two major components: a Holocene Levantine component, and from an indigenous Hadza/West African-like component. The Taforalt individuals show closest genetic affinity for ancient Epipaleolithic Natufian individuals, with slightly greater affinity for the Natufians than later Neolithic Levantines. A two-way admixture scenario using Levantine samples and modern West/East African samples as reference populations inferred that the Taforalt individuals bore 63.5% West-Eurasian Levantine-related and 36.5% sub-Saharan African-related ancestries, with no evidence for additional gene flow from the Epigravettian culture of Upper Paleolithic Europe. The Taforalt individuals also show evidence of limited Neanderthal ancestry. The paper found that these "Ancient North Africans" are ancestral to the native Berbers, and this North African autosomal element in the Maghreb peaks among the non-Arabized populations in the region.

A recent genetic study published in the "European Journal of Human Genetics" in Nature (2019) showed that Northern Africans are closely related to West Asians as well as Europeans. Northern Africans can be distinguished from West Africans and other African populations dwelling south of the Sahara.

According to Lucas-Sánchez, Marcel et al. (2021) despite the geneflow from the Middle-East, Europe and sub-Saharan Africa, an autochthonous genetic component that dates back to pre-Holocene times is still present in North African groups. The analysis also showed as a whole no genetic pattern of differentiation between Tamazight (i.e. Berber) and Arab speakers.

Ancient DNA
Unlike sub-Saharan Africans, North Africans have a similar level of Neanderthal DNA to South Europeans and West Asians, which is pre Neolithic in origin, rather than via any later admixture with peoples from outside of North Africa during the historical period. It was found that modern North Africans derive mainly from a "back to Africa" population from Eurasia "from before 12,000 years ago (ya) (i.e., prior to the Neolithic migrations)" but more recent than 40,000 years ago which seems to "represent a genetic discontinuity with the earliest modern human settlers of North Africa (those with the Aterian industry).

In 2013, Nature announced the publication of the first genetic study utilizing next-generation sequencing to ascertain the ancestral lineage of an Ancient Egyptian individual. The research was led by Carsten Pusch of the University of Tübingen in Germany and Rabab Khairat, who released their findings in the Journal of Applied Genetics. DNA was extracted from the heads of five Egyptian mummies that were housed at the institution. All the specimens were dated to between 806 BC and 124 AD, a timeframe corresponding with the Late Dynastic and Ptolemaic periods. The researchers observed that one of the mummified individuals likely belonged to the mtDNA haplogroup I2, a maternal clade that is believed to have originated in Western Asia.

In 2013, Iberomaurusian skeletons from the prehistoric sites of Taforalt and Afalou in the Maghreb were analyzed for ancient DNA. All of the specimens belonged to maternal clades associated with either North Africa or the northern and southern Mediterranean littoral, indicating gene flow between these areas since the Epipaleolithic. The ancient Taforalt individuals carried the mtDNA haplogroups U6, H, JT and V, which points to population continuity in the region dating from the Iberomaurusian period.

The E1b1b-M81 (~44%), R-M269 (~44%), and E-M132/E1a (~6%) paternal haplogroups have been found in ancient Guanche (Bimbapes) fossils excavated in Punta Azul, El Hierro, Canary Islands, which are dated to the 10th century. Maternally, the specimens all belong to the H1 clade. These locally born individuals carried the H1-16260 haplotype, which is exclusive to the Canary Islands and Algeria. Analysis of their autosomal STRs indicates that the Guanches of the Canary Islands were most closely related to Moroccan Berbers.

In 2018, DNA analysis of Later Stone Age individuals from the site of Taforalt (Iberomaurusian, 15 000 BP) and Early Neolithic Moroccans from the site of Ifri N' Ammar (7 000 BP) revealed that they were related to the modern North Africans and carried Y-DNA E-M35, E-M215*, E-L19*, and E-M78*. These studies confirmed a long-term genetic continuity in the region showing that Mesolithic Moroccans are similar to Later Stone Age individuals from the same region and possess an endemic component retained in present-day Maghrebi populations (representing 20% to 50% of their total ancestry).

A 2019 study seeking to determine if North Africans descend from strictly Palaeolithic groups (Taforalt), or subsequent migrations, discovered that most of the genetic variation in the region was shaped during the Neolithic. While the ancient samples had more of the Taforalt component, it is most frequent today in Western North Africans (Saharawi, Moroccans, Algerians) and Berbers, and suggested a continuity of this autochronous North African component. The consideration of Berber-speaking groups as the autochthonous peoples of North Africa was reinforced by these results.

See also
Y-DNA haplogroups in populations of North Africa
Y-DNA haplogroups in populations of the Near East
Population history of Egypt
Ethnic groups of North Africa
African admixture in Europe
Genetic studies on Jews
Genetic studies on Arabs
Genetic history of the Iberian Peninsula
Genetic studies on Moroccans
Genetic history of the Middle East

References

Genetic genealogy
Human population genetics
Modern human genetic history
Genetic
History of North Africa